America: A 200-Year Salute in Story and Song is a concept album and the 40th overall album by country singer Johnny Cash, released on Columbia Records in 1972 (see 1972 in music). As its title suggests, it comprises a number of tracks dedicated to the topic of American history, like several of Cash's other Americana albums. The record is a mix of songs and narration, in which Cash attempts to describe elements of the country's past, including famous personalities like Paul Revere or Big Foot. America also includes a re-recording of "Mr. Garfield" and "The Road to Kaintuck", songs previously released as singles in 1965 on Sings the Ballads of the True West. Most of the tracks on the album were written by Cash, with some exceptions, including a rendition of the well-known song "The Battle of New Orleans" and a reading of Abraham Lincoln's famous Gettysburg Address. The album was included on the Bear Family box set Come Along and Ride This Train.

Track listing

Personnel
Johnny Cash - vocals, acoustic guitar
Carl Perkins - electric guitar
Bob Wootton - electric guitar, gut-string guitar
WS Holland - drums
Marshall Grant - bass guitar
Red Lane - rhythm guitar, gut-string guitar
Charles Cochran - piano
Norman Blake - rhythm guitar, gut-string guitar, banjo
Farrell Morris - percussion
Charlie McCoy - harmonica, bass guitar
Ray Edenton - rhythm guitar

Additional personnel 
Produced by: Larry Butler
Dialogue written by: Johnny Cash
Cover design: Bill Barnes
Cover photo: Al Clayton

Charts
Album - Billboard (United States)

References

External links
 Luma Electronic entry on ''America: A 200-Year Salute in Story and Song

Johnny Cash albums
1972 albums
Columbia Records albums
Concept albums
Albums produced by Larry Butler (producer)